Rest on the Flight into Egypt is a c.1512 oil on panel painting by Titian, now in Longleat House near Warminster, Wiltshire, England. Judged to be worth about £5m in 2002, the two foot wide panel had been stolen from the first floor state drawing room in 1995 and was recovered "in a plastic shopping bag" in August 2002.

The artwork portrays Joseph, Mary, and Jesus as they stop to rest during their flight into Egypt. 

The painting has a provenance that goes back to the collection of the Archduke Leopold Wilhelm of Austria, where it was catalogued in the 1660s by his court painter David Teniers the Younger. It was purchased from Christie's by the 4th Marquess of Bath in 1878 and had been at Longleat until the theft.

As with most of the Teniers miniatures for the Archduke, it is unclear whether the engraving was made after the miniature or after this painting, but in any case the current literature points to this painting as the original source for both works. It can be seen hanging to the right of the doorway in one of Teniers' reproductions of the Archduke's gallery.

References

Paintings of the Madonna and Child by Titian
1512 paintings
Titian
Stolen works of art